Zaraysky (masculine), Zarayskaya (feminine), or Zarayskoye (neuter) may refer to:
Zaraysky District, a district of Moscow Oblast, Russia
Zaraysky (inhabited locality) (Zarayskaya, Zarayskoye), name of several rural localities in Russia